LaNitra M. Berger is an American art historian, and activist. She teaches art history at George Mason University.

Life 
She graduated from Stanford University, and Duke University.

She was Senior Director, in the Office of Fellowships, at George Mason University.

She is vice president of public policy and practice at NAFSA: Association of International Educators.

She writes and lectures on Irma Stern.

Works 

 Irma Stern and the Racial Paradox of South African Modern Art: Audacities of Color, Bloomsbury Publishing, 2020.  
 Social Justice and International Education: Research, Practice, and Perspectives, NAFSA, 2020.

References 

Living people
American art historians
Stanford University alumni
Duke University alumni
George Mason University faculty
Women art historians
Year of birth missing (living people)